Fist of Fury II (a.k.a. Chinese Connection 2, Fist of Fury Part II andTschang Fu, der Todeshammer (Tschang Fu, the hammer of death) in Germany), is a 1977 Hong Kong kung fu film directed by Iksan Lahardi and Tso-nam Lee, and starring Bruce Li and Lo Lieh. It is the sequel to Bruce Lee’s 1972's Fist of Fury.

The lead role of Chen Shan, played by Bruce Li, who goes to Shanghai to mourn his brother's death who was killed at the hands of the Japanese. Chen Shan then avenges his brother by killing the Japanese.

The final fight between Chen Shan and Miyamoto, played by Lo Lieh, is generally thought of as disappointing compared to other fights in the film, as it is slow and long. This film is generally regarded as one of Bruce Li's better films.  It was not as well received as its predecessor, but was thought to be much better than Lo Wei’s New Fist of Fury. Another sequel was released in 1979, titled Fist of Fury III (a.k.a. Chinese Connection III).

Plot
After Chen Zhen's execution in Shanghai, the Japanese feared that his death would unite all Chinese kung fu schools against them. Fearing this, the Japanese gave orders to the head of the Hong Ku School, Miyamoto (Lo Lieh) to suppress all the Chinese schools including the Ching Wu School. Miyamoto sends the Japanese along with their interpreter to the Ching Wu School ordering the leader & students to leave the School. When they refuse, the Japanese beat up the students and destroy the school. Meanwhile, one Chinese man learns about the destruction of the Ching Wu School when he goes to Shanghai to visit Chen Zhen's grave. This Chinese man is the only one who has the guts to fight the Japanese. He is known as Chen Shan (Bruce Li) who is the brother of Chen Zhen and he vows to avenge his brother's death and end the terror of the Japanese once and for all.

Cast
Bruce Li as Chen Shan
Lo Lieh as Miyamoto
Hui-Lou Chen as Wang Bar
Feng Tien as Tin Man Kwai
Kun Li as Lee Shun
Yasuyoshi Shikamura as Yanagi Saburo
James Nam as Souto Jyo
Chao Kin as Inspector Chiu
Shin Nam as Policeman #1
Shiu Yu as Policeman #2
Mui-shao Sui as Sister
Kam To as Kam Fuk
Kin-ming Lee as Cheung S’mg Hung
Cheng-hai Ching as Shun Chui
Shun-chiu Bo as Ching Wu's Brother #1
Fa-yuan Lee as Ching Wu's Brother #2
Chiang Lee as Ching Wu's Brother #3
Ze-tin Ku as Japanese Knight #1
You-pin Liu as Japanese Knight #2
Hau-bao Wai as Japanese Knight #3
Chiu-hong Seng as Japanese Knight #4
Tai-kin Yin as Japanese Knight #5
Chan-sum Lam as Japanese Knight #6
Wai-hung Ho as Japanese Knight #7
To Wai-wo

Reception
In 2001, Bruce Lee fanzine Exit the Dragon, Enter the Tiger, Carl Jones spoke favourably of this film: "Lee's martial skills are in top form here and his fights are well choreographed by veteran Tommy Lee. The final duel with Miyamoto is well staged and takes place at the Ching Wu school All in all a worthy sequel to a great Kung Fu classic."

Also admiring is Dean Medows, who wrote in his three-part Bruceploitation essay in Impact Magazine: "Fist of Fury 2 is a movie that is still regarded as one of the very finest examples of Bruce Lee exploitation cinema.  With martial arts skills constantly improving, including his earlier limited nunchaku use, Li was now firmly established as the pioneer of Bruceploitation."

Trivia
The adventures of Chen Shen were continued in the 1979 film Fist of Fury III.
Bruce Li has said that out of all the movies he made, this was one of only three that he liked (the other two were Dynamo and The Chinese Stuntman.
There is some debate as to when this film was released.  IMDb lists the release year as 1977, but the Hong Kong release date on 5 April 1979 (which is also the year that the Hong Kong Movie Database lists).  Some websites say the film was from as early as 1976.
IMDb credits the directors as Iksan Lahardi and Tso-nam Lee, while the Hong Kong Movie Database credits Siu Fung, and other websites credit Jimmy Shaw.
Nora Miao's part in Fist of Fury is played in this movie by a different woman (she is the only woman in the film) whose face is concealed by a hood, she killed herself near the beginning of the film.
While veteran Fist of Fury actors Nora Miao and Han Ying-chieh acted in the "official" sequel in the 1976 film New Fist of Fury (with the former playing the same character, while Han played a new character), fellow veteran Fist of Fury actors Tien Feng and Li Kun reprised their roles for this film.
The set of the Ching-Wu school, seen in Fist of Fury, was recreated for this film, and appears very similar to the original film.
There is an infamous moment in some prints in which Chen Shan takes a pair of nunchaku out of a Ching-Wu student's hands and the nunchaku suddenly disappear. This is due to a ban on nunchaku scenes in the United Kingdom. The U.K. video version has apparently been the source of the U.S. DVDs, but some U.K. tapes were released uncut. Ironically, one of the most widely seen publicity photos from this film involves Bruce Li holding said weapon.
Due to Fist of Fury III being released on video in the U.S. by Video Gems under the title Fist of Fury II, there has been frequent confusion as to which film is really the first sequel to the original Fist of Fury. However, the Chinese title of this film translates as Jing Wu Men sequel.

See also
List of Hong Kong films
Lo Lieh filmography

References

External links
 

1977 films
1977 martial arts films
1977 action films
1977 independent films
Bruceploitation films
1970s Cantonese-language films
Films set in the 1910s
Hong Kong sequel films
Hong Kong action films
Hong Kong independent films
Kung fu films
Hong Kong martial arts films
1970s Hong Kong films